The episodes for the seventeenth season of the anime series Naruto: Shippuden are based on Part II for Masashi Kishimoto's manga series. The season continues with the repentant Sasuke Uchiha joining with the allied shinobi forces to battle against Madara and Obito. The episodes are directed by Hayato Date, and produced by Pierrot and TV Tokyo. The season aired from May to August 2014. 

The season would make its English television debut on Adult Swim's Toonami programming block and premiere from November 14, 2021 to January 23, 2022.

The season contains three musical themes, including one opening and two endings. The opening theme,  by DOES, is used from episode 362 to 372. The first ending theme, "FLAME" by DISH// is used from episode 362 to 366. The second ending theme, "Never Change" by SHUN and Lyu:Lyu is used from episode 367 to 372.


Episode list

Home releases

Japanese

English

References
General

Specific

2014 Japanese television seasons
Shippuden Season 17